The Bill is a long-running British television police procedural television series which ran from 16 August 1983 to the show’s cancellation on 31 August 2010, named after a slang term for the police. The characters are all police officers or civilian staff at the fictional Sun Hill police station in London.

Senior officers
The following actors appeared as senior officers in The Bill. Simon Rouse, as Jack Meadows, appeared in 884 episodes, including the series finale "Respect", aired on 31 August 2010. He is the longest serving actor to portray a character in a senior role. Andrew Lancel, as Neil Manson, and Alex Walkinshaw, as "Smithy", also appeared in the series finale. The character of D.I. Roy Galloway appeared in the pilot episode, "Woodentop", aired on 16 August 1983, played by Robert Pugh. This character would go on to be portrayed by John Salthouse from 1984 onwards.

Notable senior officers
 Peter Ellis played Chief Superintendent Charles Brownlow from the start of the series in 1984 to 2000, when the character tendered his resignation in light of the Don Beech scandal. He was emphatically the longest serving station commander after serving for 16 years, with Adam Okaro a distant second with 4 years. He made a guest appearance in 2002 to attend the funerals of the six officers killed in the station fire.   
 Cyril Nri played Superintendent Adam Okaro from 2002 from 2006, initially replacing the deceased Tom Chandler as Superintendent before accepting a promotion to Borough Commander in 2006. He was the highest ranking black officer in the series history.
 Christopher Ellison appeared intermittently between 1984 and 2000 as Frank Burnside. A majority of his time on screen was as a DI, however he was a DS when he first appeared, and had become a DCI by the time he left. Ellison's popularity as the rogue officer led to an ill-fated spinoff Burnside after his exit in 2000 which lasted for one series.  
 Lisa Maxwell played DI Samantha Nixon from 2002 to 2009, when the character transferred to the child exploitation unit.
 Roberta Taylor played Inspector Gina Gold from 2002 to 2008, the character leaving due to the stress of the job.
 Simon Rouse played Detective Chief Inspector/Superintendent Jack Meadows from 1990 until the series finale. He was the longest-serving character to appear in the finale; he was with the show for 20 years, however he was a recurring character between 1990 and 1992.
 Colin Tarrant played Inspector Andrew Monroe from 1990 to 2002, replacing Christine Frazer. He appeared in over 700 episodes, more than any other high-ranking uniform officer. Only Simon Rouse as Jack Meadows had more appearances by a senior officer during the series history. The character was killed in the Sun Hill explosion in 2002.
 Ben Roberts played Chief Inspector Derek Conway from 1988 to 2002. He was the second-longest serving uniform manager, with his 14 years only eclipsed by the 16 years of Charles Brownlow. The character was killed by Jeff Simpson in a drive-by petrol bomb attack.
 Alex Walkinshaw played Dale "Smithy" Smith from 1999 until the series finale. Walkinshaw had made three one-off appearances in the series before becoming a regular member of the cast. He returned to the show in 2003, having been a PC between 1999 and 2001, by then promoted to Sergeant. He spent six years as a Sergeant, taking centre stage in several major storylines; they included the death of two lovers, one of which led to a false imprisonment, while he was stabbed on duty in his later days as a Sergeant. During the 2009 revamp, he was promoted to Inspector, holding that rank until the show ceased production in 2010.

Overview

Senior officers timeline

Sergeants
The following actors portrayed Sergeants and Detective Sergeants. Both of the series' original lead actors, Trudie Goodwin and Mark Wingett, portrayed Sergeants, with Goodwin appearing in 978 episodes as Sergeant June Ackland, and Wingett appearing in 784 episodes as D.S. Jim Carver. Sally Rogers, Sam Callis, Christopher Fox and Lucy Speed, as Sergeants Jo Masters, Callum Stone, Max Carter, and Stevie Moss, respectively, appeared in the series finale "Respect". Eric Richard's role as Sergeant Bob Cryer was widely lauded as the standout performance on The Bill. Sergeant Matthew Boyden, played by Tony O'Callaghan is notable as the murder of his character launched the spin-off series Murder Investigation Team in 2003.

Notable sergeants
 Billy Murray appeared in The Bill between 1995 and 2004, playing Don Beech. He spent five years between 1995 and 2000 as a corrupt DS, going on the run after accidentally killing DS John Boulton. He was involved in a six part mini series, Beech is Back, after a 90-minute special aired in Australia in 2001, eventually being jailed for murder by Boulton's fiancée Claire Stanton. Beech made six guest appearances in 2004 before escaping from prison.

 Tony O'Callaghan played Sergeant Matt Boyden for 12 years, from 1991 to 2003. Boyden was involved in several major storylines including two relationships with underage girls, and a long-running plot involving his daughter Amy's drug addiction, a recurring storyline that led to the character's death when Boyden was shot dead by his daughter's boyfriend so that she could profit from Boyden's life insurance. Tony O'Callaghan also appeared in an earlier episode as a criminal (series 5 episode 81).
 
 Eric Richard played Sergeant Bob Cryer from 1984 to 2004, holding the record for the show's longest serving Sergeant (17 years). The character retired in 2001 when he was accidentally shot by then PC Dale Smith, however he made a number of recurring appearances between 2002 and 2004.  

 Tony Scannell played DS Ted Roach from 1984 to 1993, when the character left Sun Hill after punching Inspector Andrew Monroe. He made two guest appearances in 2000 before the character was killed off-screen in 2004.

 Trudie Goodwin played June Ackland from 1983 to 2007, appearing first in Woodentop. She began as a WPC before promotion to Sergeant in 1996, holding that rank until the character retired in 2007, having fallen in love with school teacher Rod Jessop (Richard Hope). Ackland's storylines included being targeted by an assassin, being wrongfully arrested for corruption, marrying long-term friend DC Jim Carver and being critically injured in a collision with the station's area car. When Goodwin left The Bill in 2007 she was not only the longest serving cast member in the history of The Bill, but also held the world record for the longest time an actor has portrayed a police character.

 Larry Dann played Sergeant Alec Peters from 1984 to 1992. Peters swapped jobs with Bob Cryer, from desk sergeant to duty sergeant, then quietly left the force after making a slow recovery from being stabbed. He made a guest appearance in 2004 to attend the funeral of former DS Ted Roach.

Overview

Sergeants timeline

Detective constables
The Bills roster of Detective Constables investigate crimes under the direction of their sergeants. Kevin Lloyd, as Alfred "Tosh" Lines, appeared in more episodes than any other DC, in 383 episodes between 1988 and 1998. In the series finale, "Respect", Amita Dhiri, Chris Simmons, Patrick Robinson, and Bruce Byron play Constables Grace Dasari, Mickey Webb, Jacob Banks, and Terry Perkins. Other notable Detective Constables include Eva Sharpe, played by Diane Parish, who departed in 2004 but went on to headline the second series of Murder Investigation Team in 2005, and Rae Baker as Juliet Becker, who departed the series in the 2003 live episode "Fatal Consequences".

Notable DCs
 Kevin Lloyd played DC Tosh Lines from 1988 to 1998, when the character was written out after accepting a position in the Coroner's Office, but his off-screen axing was highly publicised due to Lloyd's addiction to alcohol.  After turning up to work drunk, he was dismissed by show producers, and Lloyd tragically died a week after his dismissal. His son, James Lloyd, later played PC Steve Hunter from 2004 to 2006.

 Mark Wingett played DC Jim Carver from 1983 to 2007. Carver was the main character in the pilot after joining as a probationary PC. He was promoted to DC in 1989 before returning to uniform in 1999. He returned to CID in 2004 before his departure in the wake of the 2005 station fire, however he returned as a DS for three guest appearances in 2007, appearing in Trudie Goodwin's final episodes as Sergeant June Ackland. Carver's storylines included addictions to alcohol and gambling, a marriage in which he was domestically abused and a second to long-term friend June. 

 Chris Simmons played DC Mickey Webb from 2000 to 2010. He made two guest appearances in 1998 and 1999 before joining the cast as a regular the following year. He transferred out of Sun Hill in 2003 after being raped by a suspect, however his move to the Murder Investigation Team, and later the National Crime Squad, saw him return for several guest appearances. In 2005, he returned to Sun Hill after being demoted from DS at the NCS.

Overview

DCs timeline

Police constables 
The largest proportion of the cast play uniformed police constables. Gary Olsen appeared as Dave Litten in "Woodentop", the series pilot, as well as the entire first series, before returning as a guest star in 1986. He was the actor who appeared in the fewest episodes as a series regular. Colin Blumenau also appears in the pilot episode, as Taffy Edwards, though his character was then called Taffy Morgan. Jeff Stewart, as Reg Hollis, appeared in 1,021 episodes between 1984 and 2008, while Graham Cole appeared as Tony Stamp in 1,204 episodes between 1984 and 2009 . Hollis and Stamp are the series' longest-serving characters, though Stamp did not become a regular member of the cast until series 4. The series finale, "Respect," features five PCs: Micah Balfour as Benjamin Gayle, Dominic Power as Leon Taylor, John Bowler as Roger Valentine, Rhea Bailey as Mel Ryder and Sarah Manners as Kirsty Knight. Ben Richards starred in Series 26 as Nate Roberts, but did not appear in "Respect".

Notable PCs

 Huw Higginson played PC George Garfield from 1989 to 1999, when the character left after his colleague Dave Quinnan had an affair with his girlfriend, Nurse Jenny Delaney.
 Andrew Paul played PC Dave Quinnan from 1989 to 2002, when the character left to transfer to SO10. He was involved in a major storyline in 1999 that saw him stabbed on duty after being ambushed by a gang of youths.  
 Lisa Geoghan played PC Polly Page from 1992 to 2004. After assisting a friend's suicide, she was wrongly jailed for murder, but later returned to Sun Hill for a brief stint as a Civilian CAD Officer before resigning.
 Jeff Stewart played PC Reg Hollis from 1984 to 2008. The character was written out off-screen by having him resign after being traumatised by the death of colleagues in a bomb blast. After appearing in over 1000 episodes, he was controversially axed from the show in 2008, leading a devastated Stewart to attempt suicide on set by slashing his wrists.
 Graham Cole played PC Tony Stamp from 1984 to 2009. The character was written out as part of a revamp of the show after producers decided that he didn't fit the new format. Cole's last episode, in which he transferred to Hendon as an advanced driving instructor, was shown on 5 November 2009; his departure meant that The Bill had no original characters remaining.

Overview

PCs timeline

Civilian staff
In addition to its large ensemble of police officers The Bill also features supporting actors in auxiliary roles. Jason Barnett, as Crime Scene Examiner Eddie Olosunje, appeared in the series finale "Respect", after appearing regularly from 2008. Moya Brady's character, Robbie Cryer, is notable for being the niece of Sergeant Bob Cryer, played by Eric Richard. Marilyn Chambers, played by Vickie Gates, was engaged to PC Reg Hollis (Jeff Stewart), while Rochelle Barrett, played by Anna Acton, was married to Chief Superintendent Ian Barrett and embarked on an affair with PC Dan Casper.

Overview

Recurring cast and characters
The Bill features a number of recurring characters, who star alongside the main cast in multiple episodes of the series. Several of these actors are notable for their appearances in other series. Richard Hope (who played Rod Jessop), for example, had previously starred as D.S. Barry Purvis in sister series Murder Investigation Team. Rosie Marcel (who played Louise Larson) would later star in BBC's Holby City as surgeon Jac Naylor, alongside The Bill alums Alex Walkinshaw and Kaye Wragg.

Police officers

Civilians

Notable guest stars
This is a list of some of the most notable actors (or actors who later became well known) to have made brief or cameo appearances in The Bill.

 Keira Knightley (at the start of her career) played child burglar Sheena Rose in a 1995 episode titled "Swan Song".
 Martin Freeman played Craig Parnell in a 1997 episode.
 Russell Brand (years before he became well-known) played teenager Billy Case in a 1994 episode titled "Land of the Blind".
 David Tennant (at the start of his career) played kidnapper Steven Clemens in a 1995 episode called "Deadline".
 Paul O'Grady – credited as "Paul Savage" – played transvestite prostitute Roxanne in three episodes between 1988 and 1990.
 Sean Bean (shortly after he graduated) played robber Horace Clark in an episode titled "Long Odds" in 1984.
 Ralf Little played Tommy Lawson in four episodes in 2001: "Judas Kiss", "Shout", "Aftershock" and "Night Games".
 Emma Bunton (before she joined the Spice Girls) played the role of Janice in one episode, "Missionary Work", in 1993.
 Catherine Tate (in her early acting career) appeared in "Give and Take" in 1993 and "Fly on the Wall" in 1994.
 James McAvoy (in his early acting career) played a Scots runaway named Gavin in an episode titled "Rent" in 1997.
 Lewis Collins played a stem cell scientist named Dr Peter Allen in an episode in 2002.
 Lorraine Kelly appeared as herself in 2003 in an episode in which PC Cathy Bradford appeared on her show on GMTV.
 Roger Daltrey appeared as reformed drug addict Larry Moore in a 1999 episode titled Cracked Up.
 Charlotte Jordan (in her first television appearance) played Jemma Jackson in 2007 episode "Crash Test".

References

External links
 Official Website
 The Bill Bios

Characters